Frederico Ferreira "Kiko" Silva (born 18 March 1995) is a Portuguese tennis player who currently plays at ITF Men's Circuit and ATP Challenger Tour. In May 2021, Silva reached a career singles high ranking of No. 168. He also reached a career-high of No. 242 in doubles in August 2016. In 2012, Silva became the first Portuguese player to win a Grand Slam title with the win at the US Open junior doubles tournament, teaming with Brit Kyle Edmund. In 2013, he would repeat the feat at the French Open junior doubles with Edmund. He reached a junior high world no. 6 in January 2012.

Juniors
Silva began his junior career in 2009. In May 2010, he won his first singles and doubles titles in a Grade 4 tournament at Istanbul, Turkey. Silva made his debut at Junior Grand Slams at the 2011 Wimbledon Championships, reaching the 3rd round. Silva was also the runner-up in the 2012 European Junior Championship (U18 division).

Professional career

2010
In 2010, Silva made his ITF Men's Circuit debut at the age of 14, at the Albufeira F3 doubles competition, and reached the final.

2021: Major debut and career-high ranking in top 170

2022: Two Challenger finals
In November he reached two back-to-back finals in Japan at the  Hyogo Noah Challenger in Kobe and in  Yokkaichi losing to Yosuke Watanuki in both and moved more than 85 positions up into the top 225 at world No. 204 on 28 November 2022.

Career finals

Challenger and Futures/World Tennis Tour Finals

Singles: 34 (16 titles, 18 runners-up)

Doubles: 22 (12 titles, 10 runners-up)

ITF Junior Circuit

Singles: 8 (2 titles, 6 runners-up)

Doubles: 14 (9 titles, 5 runners-up)

Performance timelines

Singles
Current through the 2022 Australian Open.

Doubles

Head-to-head vs. Top 20 players
This section contains Silva's win–loss record against players who have been ranked 20th or higher in the world rankings during their careers.

Career earnings

* As of 10 April 2017.

National participation

Davis Cup (4 wins, 2 losses)
Silva has played for the Portugal Davis Cup team since 2014 and has played 6 matches in 5 ties. His singles record is 3–2 and his doubles record is 1–0 (4–2 overall).

   indicates the result of the Davis Cup match followed by the score, date, place of event, the zonal classification and its phase, and the court surface.

References

External links
 
 
 

People from Caldas da Rainha
Portuguese male tennis players
Living people
French Open junior champions
US Open (tennis) junior champions
1995 births
Grand Slam (tennis) champions in boys' doubles
Sportspeople from Leiria District
21st-century Portuguese people